FSR 1758 is a large and bright but heavily obscured globular cluster belonging to the Milky Way galaxy. It is located at a distance of about 11.5 kpc from the Sun and about 3.7 kpc from the center of the galaxy. As FSR 1758 lies behind the galactic bulge, it is heavily obscured by the foreground stars and dust. It was first noticed in 2007 in 2MASS data and believed to be an open cluster, until data from the Gaia mission revealed in 2018 that it is a globular cluster.

The size and brightness of FSR 1758 may be comparable to or exceed that of the Omega Centauri cluster, which is widely believed to be the nucleus of a dwarf galaxy that merged into Milky Way in the past. Therefore, FSR 1758 may be the nucleus of dwarf galaxy tentatively named Scorpius Dwarf galaxy. It may also be similar to another globular cluster, Messier 54, which is known to be the nucleus of Sagittarius Dwarf Spheroidal Galaxy.

References

Globular clusters
Scorpius (constellation)